Nasal administration, popularly known as snorting, is a route of administration in which drugs are insufflated through the nose. It can be a form of either topical administration or systemic administration, as the drugs thus locally delivered can go on to have either purely local or systemic effects. Nasal sprays are locally acting drugs such as decongestants for cold and allergy treatment, whose systemic effects are usually minimal. Examples of systemically active drugs available as nasal sprays are migraine drugs, rescue medications for overdose and seizure emergencies, nicotine replacement, and hormone treatments.

Advantages 
The nasal cavity is covered by a thin mucosa which is well vascularised. Therefore, a drug molecule can be transferred quickly across the single epithelial cell layer directly to the systemic blood circulation without first-pass hepatic and intestinal metabolism. The effect is often reached within 5 min for smaller drug molecules. Nasal administration can therefore be used as an alternative to oral administration, by crushing or grinding tablets or capsules and snorting or sniffing the resulting powder, providing a rapid onset of effects.  If a fast effect is desired or if the drug is extensively degraded in the gut or liver, drugs which are poorly absorbed orally can also be given by this route.

Large-molecule drugs can also be delivered directly to the brain by the intranasal route, the only practical means of doing so, following the olfactory and trigeminal nerves (see section below), for widespread central distribution throughout the central nervous system with little exposure to the blood. This delivery method to the brain was functionally demonstrated in humans in 2006, using insulin, a large peptide hormone that acts as a nerve growth factor in the brain.

Limitations 
Nasal administration is primarily suitable for potent drugs since only a limited volume can be sprayed into the nasal cavity. Drugs for continuous and frequent administration may be less suitable because of the risk of harmful long-term effects on the nasal epithelium. Nasal administration has also been associated with a high variability in the amount of drug absorbed. Upper airway infections may increase the variability as may the extent of sensory irritation of the nasal mucosa, differences in the amount of liquid spray that is swallowed and not kept in the nasal cavity and differences in the spray actuation process. However, the variability in the amount absorbed after nasal administration should be comparable to that after oral administration.

Nasal drugs 
The area of intranasal medication delivery provides a huge opportunity for research – both for specifically developed pharmaceutical drugs designed for intranasal treatment, as well as for investigating off label uses of commonly available generic medications. Nasal sprays for local effect are quite common. Steroids, antiasthma medications such as salbutamol, ipratropium, montelukast and a large number of inhalational anaesthetic agents are being used commonly. The recent developments in intranasal drug delivery systems are prodigious. Several antimigraine drugs, available by the trade names of Imitrex- sumatriptan; Zomig - Zolmitriptan; Migranal - Dihydroergotamine and the OTC nasal spray Sinol-M; are also currently administered by nasal administration because a fast effect is desired and oral administration can be prohibited by nausea. Peptide drugs (hormone treatments) are also available as nasal sprays, in this case to avoid drug degradation after oral administration. The peptide analogue desmopressin is, for example, available for both nasal and oral administration, for the treatment of diabetes insipidus. The bioavailability of the commercial tablet is 0.1% while that of the nasal spray is 3-5% according to the SPC (Summary of Product Characteristics). Syntocinon nasal spray containing oxytocin is used to increase duration and strength of contractions during labour. Intranasal oxytocin is also being actively investigated for many psychiatric conditions including alcohol withdrawal, anorexia nervosa, PTSD, autism, anxiety disorders, pain sensation and schizophrenia. Intranasal Calcitonin, calcitonin-salmon is used to treat Hypercalcaemia arising out of malignancy, Paget's disease of bone, post menopausal and steroid induced osteoporosis, Phantom limb pain and other metabolic bone abnormalities, available as Rockbone, Fortical and Miacalcin Nasal Spray. GnRH analogues like nafarelin and busurelin are used for the treatment of anovulatory infertility, hypogonadotropic hypogonadism, delayed puberty and cryptorchidism. Other potential drug candidates for nasal administration include anaesthetics, antihistamines (Azelastine), antiemetics (particularly metoclopramide and ondansetron) and sedatives that all benefit from a fast onset of effect. Intranasal midazolam is found to be highly effective in acute episodes of seizures in children. Recently, the upper part of the nasal cavity, as high as the cribriform plate, has been proposed for drug delivery to the brain. This "transcribrial route" published first in 2014 was suggested by the author (Baig AM. et al,) for drugs to be given for Primary Meningoencephalitis 
Naloxone is used intravenously in opiate addiction in emergency cases, in rapid opiate detoxification, and as a diagnostic tool. The nasal drug administration of naloxone was found to be as effective as the intravenous route. In opioid overdoses, where hypotension and sometimes damaged veins make intravenous administration difficult, nasal naloxone offers a wide margin of safety and reduced risk of infection from vessel puncture while enabling even untrained bystanders to assist a victim.
The prevention of abnormal nasal blood vessel growth (Avastin) and even the delivery of medications and drug antidotes such as hydroxocobalamin (antidote to cyanide poisoning) are being developed via intranasal medications. More recently interest is developing on delivery of a number of peptides and other drugs to the nose for direct transport into the brain to treat neurodegenerative disorders such as Alzheimer's. Intranasal insulin is being investigated for treatment of neurodegenerative disorders such as Alzheimer's disease. In ketamine, commonly being used for the treatment of breakthrough pain in patients with chronic pain is now becoming an area of significant research interest for the treatment of bipolar disease and major depressive disorder with early results suggesting a strong and prolonged antidepressant effect following a single subdissociative dose (50 mg) of ketamine.

The live attenuated influenza vaccine sold under the brand names FluMist (US) or Fluenz (Europe) is delivered intranasally. Flumist is a Quadrivalent Vaccine which contains four vaccine virus strains: an A/H1N1 strain, an A/H3N2 strain and two B strains. FluMist Quadrivalent contains B strains from both the B/Yamagata/14/88 and the B/Victoria/2/87 lineages. It has been approved by the CDC for vaccinating all eligible people between 2 and 49 years of age.

Olfactory transfer 
There is about 20 mL capacity in the adult human nasal cavity. The major part of the approximately 150 cm2 surface in the human nasal cavity is covered by respiratory epithelium, across which systemic drug absorption can be achieved. The olfactory epithelium is situated in the upper posterior part and covers approximately 10 cm2 of the human nasal cavity. The nerve cells of the olfactory epithelium project into the olfactory bulb of the brain, which provides a direct connection between the brain and the external environment. The transfer of drugs to the brain from the blood circulation is normally hindered by the blood–brain barrier (BBB), which is virtually impermeable to passive diffusion of all but small, lipophilic substances. However, if drug substances can be transferred along the olfactory nerve cells, they can bypass the BBB and enter the brain directly.

The olfactory transfer of drugs into the brain is thought to occur by either slow transport inside the olfactory nerve cells to the olfactory bulb or by faster transfer along the perineural space surrounding the olfactory nerve cells into the cerebrospinal fluid surrounding the olfactory bulbs and the brain (8, 9) 

Olfactory transfer could theoretically be used to deliver drugs that have a required effect in the central nervous system such as those for Parkinson’s or Alzheimer’s diseases. Studies have been presented that show that direct transfer of drugs is achievable but the possibility of olfactory delivery of therapeutically relevant doses to humans remains to be demonstrated.

References 

Medical treatments
Dosage forms
Routes of administration